Ohs is a small village that is part of the Värnamo Municipality, in the Småland province of southern Sweden.

Location and history
Ohs is situated by the south tip of the lake Rusken, where the historical Nydala Abbey is also situated at the lake-shore. The community is founded around a mill that produced energy for the iron production from 1600. In 1893, it was converted to a paper pulp factory, which operated until 1978. At the old factory site there is now a museum. Since the paper mill closed, the population has shrunk to around 100 people. Many foreigners own former small residential houses in the area for vacation needs.

Narrow gauge railway
Ohs is the starting point of a  narrow gauge Ohsabanan, a museum railway to Bor, 15 km away. The railway was constructed in the summer of 1910 and runs steam trains.

External links
  http://www.ohsabanan.com/
 http://www.ohsbruk.se/

Populated places in Jönköping County
Populated places in Värnamo Municipality